The Juárez–Lincoln International Bridge (also known as Laredo International Bridge 2) is one of four vehicular international bridges located in the cities of Laredo, Texas, and Nuevo Laredo, Tamaulipas, that connect the United States and Mexico over the Rio Grande (Río Bravo).  It is owned and operated by City of Laredo and the Secretaria de Comunicaciones y Transportes (Mexico's federal Secretariat of Communication and Transportation).

History
The Juarez-Lincoln International Bridge was named in honor of the Mexican President Benito Juárez and U.S. President Abraham Lincoln. It was built in 1976 to alleviate traffic on the Gateway to the Americas International Bridge and to accommodate the fast-growing cities of Laredo and Nuevo Laredo.

Description
The international bridge is for buses and non-commercial traffic only. The bridge is also known as Bridge Number Two, Laredo-Nuevo Laredo Bridge 2, New Bridge, Puente Juárez-Lincoln, Laredo II and Puente Nuevo. It had a dedicated lane for SENTRI program users until 2018. SENTRI users now have to cross through the Gateway to the Americas International Bridge. The change was made to accommodate SENTRI users from long lines and long waiting.

Location
This bridge is located in the southern terminus of Interstate 35 east of downtown Laredo, Texas and on the northern terminus of Luis Donaldo Colosio Loop in Nuevo Laredo, Tamaulipas. It operates 24 hours a day.

Border crossing

The Laredo Juarez-Lincoln Port of Entry is the international port of entry inspection station at the Juarez-Lincoln International Bridge.

The station was built in 1976, primarily to divert truck traffic from the congested Gateway to the Americas International Bridge.  However, it too was soon overwhelmed with traffic.  Currently, all trucks are inspected at the other bridge crossings, leaving only passenger vehicles and buses crossing at this location.

See also

References

External links
 Juarez-Lincoln International Bridge Webcam (American Side)
 Juarez-Lincoln International Bridge Webcam (Mexican Side)
 Statistical Data

International bridges in Laredo, Texas
International bridges in Tamaulipas
Toll bridges in Texas
Tolled sections of Interstate Highways
Bridges completed in 1977
Road bridges in Texas
Toll bridges in Mexico
Interstate 35
Bridges on the Interstate Highway System
Box girder bridges in the United States
Box girder bridges